The 1939 Milan–San Remo was the 32nd edition of the Milan–San Remo cycle race and was held on 19 March 1939. The race started in Milan and finished in San Remo. The race was won by Gino Bartali of the Legnano team.

General classification

References

Milan–San Remo
1939 in road cycling
1939 in Italian sport
Milan–San Remo